Voinești is a commune in Vaslui County, Western Moldavia, Romania. It is composed of eleven villages: Avrămești, Băncești, Corobănești, Gârdești, Mărășești, Obârșeni, Obârșenii Lingurari, Rugăria, Stâncășeni, Uricari and Voinești.

References

Communes in Vaslui County
Localities in Western Moldavia